Psycho Sid may refer to:

Sid Eudy, an American professional wrestler
a character in the British comic Smut